Charles Booher may refer to:

 Charles F. Booher (1848–1921), U.S. Representative from Missouri
 Charles T. Booher (1959–2005), American engineer